A Crack in the Floor (2001) is a horror film directed by Sean Stanek and Corbin Timbrook.

Plot
For the past 33 years Jeremiah Hill (Roger Hewlett) has lived alone, with no contact with the outside world, and he intends to keep it that way. Jeremiah's mother (Tracy Scoggins) had always warned him not to associate with the outside world, and her brutal rape and killing right before his eyes taught him a lesson he intends never to forget; and those who enter his world will pay a deadly price. As Lehman (Mario Lopez) and his five friends from Los Angeles start their weekend camping trip they run into Tyler Trout (Gary Busey) and Floyd Fryed (Rance Howard) who represent the gateway into this distorted world that they are about to enter. These things just don't happen in the small mountain town of Sheriff Talmidge (Bo Hopkins) and Deputy Kevin Gordon (Stephen Saux). By stumbling upon this lonely cabin in the woods, the men have shattered 33 years of solitude in Jeremiah's world. Soon their weekend trip of hiking and camping will become a nightmare of survival.

Cast
 Mario Lopez as Lehman 
 Gary Busey as Tyler Trout 
 Bo Hopkins as Sheriff Talmidge 
 Rance Howard as Floyd Fryed 
 Tracy Scoggins as Jeremiah's Mother 
 Justine Priestley as Kate 
 Daisy McCrackin as Heidi 
 Bentley Mitchum as Johnny 
 Jason Oliver as Billy 
 Francesca Orsi as Sunny
 Stephen Saux as Kevin Gordon
 Roger Hewlett as Jeremiah
Kyle Patrick Feuer as Young Jeremiah
 Frank Collison as Turner
 Bill Erwin as Harold 
 Jacquie Barnbrook as Maggie 
 Robert Ambrose as Russell 
 Con Schell as Brad Mitchell 
 Madeleine Lindley as Jesse
 David Naughton as The Empty Man

References

External links

2001 films
2001 horror films
American horror films
2000s English-language films
2000s American films